Rory Flack (Flack-Mitchell) (born April 28, 1969) is a professional African American Figure Skater and former competitor. She is the first African American woman to perform a back flip on the ice (in 1991) and in 1994 she became the first African American woman to win the US Open Professional Figure Skating Championships. She is very well known for her signature Russian splits.

Personal life
Rory Flack was born in Belleville, Illinois. She is the daughter of Dorothy Jackson and William Flack, and is the niece of Roberta Flack. Raised in Phoenix, Arizona until age 10, then until 21 in San Diego, California, she later resided for 15 years in Wasilla, Alaska. She was married to 8X Austrian National Champion & 1992 Olympian Ralph Burghart from 1992 to 2007. She has two sons, Rendell Burghart, born 28 September 1993, and Remington Burghart, born 17 January 1997. Rendell played tennis for Eastern Washington University and Graduated on the Deans List majoring in Film. Remington is a 2011 United States National Juvenile Bronze Pairs Medalist. and competed 2017 to COVID-19 Internationally for club ESI-Skating , SkateAustria International Competitive Team.

Flack married Roi Mitchell Sr. on April 6, 2015 in Washington, DC.

Skating career

Flack began skating at age 5. At age 13, she met the pioneer for African Americans in figure skating, Mabel Fairbanks. Fairbanks inspired Flack to continue skating after wanting to stop at an early age due to racism. Two years later, Debi Thomas, Bobby Beauchamp and Rory Flack skated to three medals at the US National Championships. This was the first time three African Americans competed at the Nationals, and they all earned spots on the international team.

In 1986, Flack won the junior bronze medal at the U.S. Championships. She also competed internationally, winning the silver medal at the 1987 Grand Prix International St. Gervais. Her performance at the 1987 U.S. Championships attracted national attention and earned her an appearance with footage on Saturday Night Live. It was the first time a figure skater was on the show. Two months before the qualifying event for the 1992 Winter Olympics in Albertville, France, she injured her back and could not compete. She retired from competitive skating in the winter of 1991.

Flack became a Competitive World Professional, 1991 and 1994 US Open Professional Champion, the 2002 American Open Artistic Champion and competed for Team USA in the 2006 CBS Ice Wars. In 1991, Flack started her career as a professional figure skater. She moved from California to Cincinnati and skated in the production Broadway on Ice. She choreographed a routine, auditioned, and was selected for a solo spot.

She heard from fellow skaters about an open professional competition, the US Open Challenge Cup. Despite being advised not to compete by the show producer because she would lose her next gig, Flack entered the competition with her friends' support. She had a close childhood friend Doug Mattis who taught her to do a back flip on ice, making her first black women in the world with this ability. The US Open competition had two parts for the skaters without a world title. The winner of the Challenge round would advance to the Championship round. The Championship round was filled with Olympic Champions and world medalists. Performing to Ella Fitzgerald and Louis Armstrong's “Summertime”, she not only won the Challenge Cup, but also placed third in the Championship round, won the inaugural Golden Blade Award (given to the most artistic skater of the entire competition) and became the star of Ice Capades.

In 1992, while starring in Ice Capades, Flack took time off from the tour to compete once again at the US Open. She skated to “Fever” and a 5-minute version of “Am I Blue”, and won the silver medal.

In September 1993, Rory gave birth to her first son, Rendell. Two weeks later she skated as a pair team with her then-husband in the opening of the Rockefeller Center.

In 1994, Flack was invited to join The Nutcracker on Ice. She co-starred as the Sugar Plum Fairy alongside Olympic champions Oksana Baiul and Brian Boitano.

Still driven to win the US Open, she trained daily from 2 am to 4 am. Flack entered the US Open, where the reigning world champion Yuka Sato also planned to compete. Performing to Aretha Franklin's "Think", Flack took first place after the Technical Program and went on to win the title.

Shortly after, she opened a figure skating school in Alaska, the Artistry Of Movement Ice Skating Academy. The academy was created to train grassroots skaters from learning to fall to winning championships. She also continued to perform on national and world television in professional competitions and shows in her free time.

In 2001, Flack appeared with Aretha Franklin, choreographing one production number and two solos for the event. One week later, Flack accepted the Lifetime Achievement Award from the Women's Sports Foundation on behalf of Mabel Fairbanks. Inspired once again by Fairbanks, Flack founded her production company, The Color of Ice Production Inc.

In January 2002, she created, produced and choreographed the first all African American ice skating production, Ebony on Ice. The production ran for ten weeks at the Legacy Theater in Chicago. Flack appeared as the headliner and had guest artist Savion Glover, Kenny Gambel and Howard Hewitt. Later that year she won her second professional title at the American Open Professional Championships.

In 2003, Flack launched her revised production of "Soul Spectacular On Ice", also known as "Ebony On Ice", in Florida and Washington, DC, with sold-out performances at the Lincoln Theater. The show received rave reviews from the Washington Post with the article "On Ice, Black Music And Dance Catch Fire", by Natalie Hopkinson, with the opening statement, "The ancestors couldn't have foreseen this." It sold out performances, and  a national tour was scheduled.

Later the same year, Flack appeared as a guest star in Ray Charles' last performance, A Tribute to Ray Charles on Ice at the Staples Arena in Los Angeles, California. In 2004, Flack was an assistant choreographer for a television production of A Tribute to Earth Wind and Fire on Ice. She was also the lead choreographer for two production numbers, two personal solos and a number for Brian Boitano and Brian Orser. In 2006, she skated in A Tribute to Wynona Judd while Wynona and Naomi Judd sang a duet. She also skated in the last aired professional skating championships, Ice Wars USA Versus the World.

In the fall of 2007, Flack took a hiatus from performing due to health issues that brought on the loss of some speech and movements in her arms and legs. She began working with a team of doctors on the east coast while living in Utah, then relocated to Philadelphia in the spring of 2013. In winter 2014, Flack was diagnosed with peripheral neuropathy. Flack-Mitchell currently lives in Texas and is overcoming the complications of her illness to perform at the 2016 US Open Professional Figure Skating Championships on May 31 in Las Vegas, Nevada.

Coaching and choreography career
Flack began choreographing her programs as a senior competitor. 1991 Rory began coaching in Kentucky and Ohio. After signing her first show contract for a show in King Island in Cincinnati, Ohio. she was then approached by Indiana World Skating Academy to coach. Shortly after taking the position in 1992, she began studying under Brian Wright. Later that summer Flack took over the choreography department in Wright's absence for his illness. In 1993, she was sought out by the Seattle Skating Club and was hired as Program Director to build their Basic Skills Program, as well as to develop the new Olympic View Training rink in Lynnwood, Washington.

From 1993, she worked in Alaska after being hired by the Anchorage FSC to direct and head their Learn to Skate program. One year later Flack founded Artistry Of Movement ISA. In 2009, she relocated Artistry of Movement Academy to Provo, Utah, where she served as head coach for three years. In April 2012, Flack started dividing her time coaching between Alaska; Houston, TX; Provo, Utah; Washington, D.C.; Chicago; and New Jersey, and offered clinics worldwide.

Recording artist

Flack has expressed interest in a recording career. "I have always loved singing and have wanted to record a CD. Getting together with Max-A-Million from Chicago and having a producer/writer is the most exciting feeling. I feel it is never too late to live your dreams."

Results

References

External links 
 In depth oral history interview
 

American female single skaters
American figure skating coaches
Figure skating choreographers
African-American sportsmen
Living people
Sportspeople from Belleville, Illinois
Sportspeople from Phoenix, Arizona
Sportspeople from San Diego
People from Wasilla, Alaska
1971 births
21st-century African-American sportspeople
21st-century African-American women
20th-century African-American sportspeople
20th-century African-American women